Edgar Bernhardt (Russian: Эдгар Бернхардт; born 30 March 1986) is a Kyrgyz professional footballer who plays as a midfielder for Udon Thani in Thai League 2.

Early life
Bernhardt was born in Novopavlovka, Soviet Union, now Kyrgyzstan.

Club career

In Germany and the Netherlands
Bernhardt made his debut on the professional league level in the Eerste Divisie for FC Emmen on 10 August 2007, when he came on as a substitute in the 55th minute in a game against Go Ahead Eagles. He returned to VfL Osnabrück on 30 June 2008 and signed on 8 June 2009 a contract with Wuppertaler SV.

Kedah
On 27 May 2019, Bernhardt agreed to join Malaysia Super League side Kedah. He finished the year with two goals and eight assists in 20 appearances.

Abahani Limited Dhaka
In December 2019, Bernhardt signed for Bangladesh Premier League club Abahani Limited Dhaka.

Dordoi Bishkek
On 1 August 2020, Dordoi Bishkek announced the signing of Bernhardt on a contract until the end of the 2020 Kyrgyz Premier League season. On 16 January 2021, Dordoi Bishkek confirmed the departure of Bernhardt after the expiration of his contract. Bernhardt returned to Dordoi Bishkek on 19 July 2021, after six month with Uzbekistan Super League club Andijon.

International career
Bernhardt was called up in May 2015 by Aleksandr Krestinin to represent the Kyrgyzstan national team in the 2018 FIFA World Cup Qualifiers against Bangladesh and Australia. He scored his first international goal in his debut against Bangladesh with a penalty kick, helping his side to win 3–1 in Dhaka.

Personal life
Bernhardt holds German, Kyrgyzstani and Russian citizenship. He was born in Kyrgyzstan, but moved to Stemwede, Germany with his family in his early childhood.

Career statistics

International

Scores and results list Kyrgyzstan's goal tally first, score column indicates score after each Bernhardt goal.

Honours
Kedah
 Malaysia FA Cup: 2019
Malaysia Cup: runner-up 2019

References

External links
 
 
 
 
 

1986 births
Living people
People from Chüy Region
Kyrgyzstani footballers
Kyrgyzstani people of German descent
Citizens of Germany through descent
German footballers
Kyrgyzstan international footballers
Kyrgyzstani Christians
Kyrgyzstani expatriate footballers
German expatriate footballers
Association football midfielders
VfL Osnabrück players
Eintracht Braunschweig II players
FC Emmen players
VfL Osnabrück II players
Wuppertaler SV players
Vaasan Palloseura players
FC Lahti players
MKS Cracovia (football) players
FF Jaro players
Widzew Łódź players
FC Energie Cottbus players
Stal Mielec players
Eerste Divisie players
2. Bundesliga players
3. Liga players
Regionalliga players
Veikkausliiga players
Ekstraklasa players
Edgar Bernhardt
I liga players
Edgar Bernhardt
German expatriate sportspeople in the Netherlands
German expatriate sportspeople in Finland
German expatriate sportspeople in Poland
Expatriate footballers in the Netherlands
Expatriate footballers in Finland
Expatriate footballers in Poland
Expatriate footballers in Thailand
Expatriate footballers in Oman
2019 AFC Asian Cup players
Kyrgyzstani expatriate sportspeople in Thailand